Hdi (Hedi, Xədi, Tur) is an Afro-Asiatic language of Cameroon and Nigeria.

In Cameroon, Hdi is only spoken in one village on the Nigerian border, namely Tourou (arrondissement of Mokolo, department of Mayo-Tsanaga, Far North Region) by 1000 speakers. It is mainly spoken in Nigeria. The Hdi and Mabas languages are closely related, but are distinct languages.

References

Biu-Mandara languages
Languages of Cameroon